Wang Haibo (born 23 September 1965) is a Chinese former basketball player who competed in the 1984 Summer Olympics. He is from Qingdao.

References

1965 births
Living people
Chinese men's basketball players
Olympic basketball players of China
Basketball players at the 1984 Summer Olympics
Basketball players from Qingdao